Pogonocherus pesarinii is a species of beetle in the family Cerambycidae. It was described by Sama in 1993. It is known from Morocco.

References

Pogonocherini
Beetles described in 1993